Chester the Molester (also known as Chester the Predator) was a comic strip by Dwaine B. Tinsley (December 31, 1945 – May 23, 2000), Hustler magazine's cartoon editor. Tinsley produced the strip for 13 years. The premise of the strip was a tongue-in-cheek take on a man, Chester, who was interested in sexually molesting women and prepubescent girls. The Chester cartoon showed many scenes in which the main character—and later on his girlfriend Hester—tricked or attempted to trick women and prepubescent girls into sexually compromising positions.

Molestation charge
In 1984, Tinsley was accused of molesting his 13-year-old daughter, Allison, over a period of five years. He was convicted and served 23 months of a six-year prison sentence before his conviction was overturned on the grounds that his conviction violated the First Amendment because it was based, in part, on his comic strip. During his incarceration, he continued dispatching new strips to Hustler from his cell to be edited by Edward Kuhnel.

References

Further reading 
 

1976 comics debuts
1989 comics endings
Humor comics
Erotic comics
Fictional rapists
Fictional pedophiles
Black comedy comics
American comics characters
Male characters in comics
Comics characters introduced in 1976
Obscenity controversies in comics